Bellerose Terrace is a hamlet and census-designated place (CDP) in the Town of Hempstead in Nassau County, on Long Island, in New York, United States. The population was 2,329 at the 2020 census.

Geography

Bellerose Terrace is located on the border of Queens County. It is adjacent to the neighborhoods of Bellerose, Queens and Queens Village, Queens in New York City, the Incorporated Village of Bellerose in Nassau County to the east, Floral Park to the southeast, and Elmont to the south.

Demographics

2020 census

Note: the US Census treats Hispanic/Latino as an ethnic category. This table excludes Latinos from the racial categories and assigns them to a separate category. Hispanics/Latinos can be of any race.

2010 Census
As of the census of 2010, there were 2,198 people, 633 households, and 544 families residing in the CDP. The population density was 22,212.2 per square mile (8,328.2/km2). There were 587 housing units at an average density of 6,683.2/sq mi (2,505.8/km2). The racial makeup of the CDP was 49.5% White, 8.4% African American, 0.1% Native American, 28.1% Asian, 0.00% Pacific Islander, 10.4% from other races, and 3.5% from two or more races. Hispanic or Latino of any race were 25.8% of the population.

There were 633 households, out of which 41.9% had children under the age of 18 living with them, 66.8% were married couples living together, 13.3% had a female householder with no husband present, and 14.1% were non-families. 11.2% of all households were made up of individuals, and 4.3% had someone living alone who was 65 years of age or older. The average household size was 3.47 and the average family size was 3.76.

In the CDP, the population was spread out, with 24.1% under the age of 18, 9.6% from 18 to 24, 29.7% from 25 to 44, 27.5% from 45 to 64, and 9.1% who were 65 years of age or older. The median age was 37.9 years. For every 100 females, there were 98.2 males. For every 100 females age 18 and over, there were 89.5 males.

The median income for a household in the CDP was $92,750, and the median income for a family was $96,094. Males had a median income of $52,617 versus $53,478 for females. The per capita income for the CDP was $31,802. About 3.8% of families and 3.8% of the population were below the poverty line, including none of those under age 18 and 10.8% of those age 65 or over.  According to the 2013 American Community Survey, 29.9% of families make $100,000 to $199,000 and 15.3% make $200,000 or more.

Education
Bellerose Terrace is served by the Floral Park-Bellerose Union Free School District for elementary education, and the Sewanhaka Central High School District for secondary education; the elementary district feeds into it.

Transportation 
The Cross Island Parkway travels through the heart of Bellerose Terrace. Additionally, the hamlet's southern border is the Main Line of the Long Island Rail Road.

References

Hempstead, New York
Census-designated places in New York (state)
Hamlets in New York (state)
Census-designated places in Nassau County, New York
Hamlets in Nassau County, New York